For All That's Given, Wasted is a rare debut EP by Canadian rock band Pilot Speed (at the time known as Pilate).

Track listing

Pilot Speed albums
2001 EPs